A318 may refer to:

 A318 road (Great Britain), a main road in the United Kingdom connecting Chertsey and Byfleet
 Autovía A-318, a highway in the Andalucian region of Spain
 Airbus A318, a short- to medium-range, narrow-body, commercial passenger jet airliner built by Airbus Industrie

cs:Airbus A320#A318
fr:Airbus A320#A318
vi:Airbus A320#A318
zh:空中客车A320#A318